JVibe was a bimonthly magazine for Jewish teens aged 12–18, published by a company called JFL Media between 2004 and 2009.

Overview 
Lack of funds forced the publisher to close down all activities in October 2009, including the publication of JVibe. Sections of the magazine included pop culture events, celebrity interviews, news from Israel, sports stories, music, and movies.

The magazine's companion website, jvibe.com, was taken over by web hosting service Jvillage Network, but has been inactive since April 2010. It included a discussion board, blog entries, on-going polls, surveys, and contests.

The magazine's website hosted "The Homer Calendar," an online guide to the Jewish ritual counting of the omer using the Homer Simpson character from The Simpsons.

References

2004 establishments in the United States
2009 disestablishments in the United States
Bimonthly magazines published in the United States
Defunct magazines published in the United States
Jewish magazines published in the United States
Magazines established in 2004
Magazines disestablished in 2009
Teen magazines
Religious works for children